This is a list of episodes for the 1963–66 television series Burke's Law. For the third season, the show was revamped and renamed Amos Burke Secret Agent.

Series overview

Episodes

Season 1 (1963–64)

Season 2 (1964–65)

Season 3 (1965–66)

External links
 
 

Burke's Law (1963 series)